Gloud Wilson McLelan (April 18, 1796–April 6, 1858) was a businessman and politician in Nova Scotia. He represented Londonderry Township from 1836 to 1847 and Colchester County from 1851 to 1858 in the Nova Scotia House of Assembly.

He was born in Great Village, Nova Scotia, the son of David McLelan and Mary Durling, and, after very little formal education, he entered business as a merchant and shipper. McLelan married Martha Spencer in 1822. He died in office in Halifax.

His son Archibald succeeded him in the assembly and went on to serve in the Canadian House of Commons and Senate.

References 
Biography at the Dictionary of Canadian Biography Online

1796 births
1858 deaths
Nova Scotia pre-Confederation MLAs